OWOX  is a software company founded in 2013. The company specializes in web analytics and business intelligence products and services. OWOX's services include development of business intelligence (BI) products based on Google Cloud Platform, assistance in implementing BI products on Google Analytics 360 Suite, development of individual measurement strategies, and analytics training. The company annually co-organizes a number of conferences on web analytics and Ecommerce. Vladyslav Flaks is the CEO of OWOX.

Product
The OWOX's BI products help users consolidate, process, analyze and extract insights from data.
BI Smart Data helps get instant answers to questions about data, asked in plain English, without having to involve developers or analysts.
BI Attribution helps reveal the real value of your advertising campaigns, considering the contribution of each advertising channel at each stage of a customer’s purchase journey, including offline transactions.
BI Pipeline facilitates the task of bringing together data from a number of systems.

Conferences
The company organizes and co-organizes annual conferences on web analytics and Ecommerce:
Go Analytics! is an annual conference on web analytics, co-organized with Google. The event is directed at business executives, marketing specialists, business development managers, data analysts, and digital experts. GoAnalytics! takes place every spring in Moscow.
eCommerce is an annual conference and exhibition focused on Ecommerce. The event is directed at e-tailers, CEOs of online businesses, digital marketing specialists, and agencies. eCommerce takes place every autumn in Kyiv.
Analyze! is a specialized annual conference on web analytics, directed at data analysts, digital marketing specialists, executives of online and omnichannel businesses. Analyze! takes place every spring in Kyiv.
HOWWEDOIT is an informal meeting of developers and business analysts. The event is directed at practicing developers, with a view to sharing expertise in developing and promoting IT products. HOWWEDOIT takes place every three months in Dnipro.

Expertise
OWOX is a certified partner of Google Analytics and Google Cloud Platform, and also the first company in EMEA certified as a Google Analytics 360 Authorized Reseller.

References

Business software companies
Privately held companies in Ukraine